Zinc finger protein 74 is a protein that in humans is encoded by the ZNF74 gene. Schizophrenia susceptibility has been associated with a mutation in this protein.

Interactions 

ZNF74 has been shown to interact with POLR2A.

References

Further reading

External links 
 

Transcription factors